Sefer ha-Qabbalah (Hebrew: ספר הקבלה, "Book of Tradition") was a book written by Abraham ibn Daud around 1160–1161. The book is a response to Karaitic attacks against the historical legitimacy of Rabbinic Judaism, and contains, among other items, the controversial tale of the kidnapping by pirates of four great rabbinic scholars from Babylonian academies, whose subsequent ransoming by Jewish communities around the Mediterranean accounts for the transmission of scholarly legitimacy to the rabbis of Jewish centers in North Africa and Spain. In terms of chronology, Sefer ha-Qabbalah continues where the Iggeret of Rabbi Sherira Gaon leaves off, adding invaluable historical anecdotes not found elsewhere. The Sefer ha-Qabbalah puts the compilation of the Mishnah by Rabbi Judah HaNasi in year 500 of the Seleucid Era (corresponding to 189 CE).

At the time, the term "Kabbalah" simply meant "tradition". It had not yet assumed the mythical and esoteric connotations for which it is now known.

Influence 
Although Sefer ha-Qabbalah had enormous influence as an authority on the history of Spanish Jewry, modern scholarship no longer considers it to be objective history. Nonetheless, it is valuable as a source of information on the life and thought of 12th century Spain.

References

Bibliography

External links 
 1887 publication of Sefer Hakabbalah in Mediaeval Jewish chronicles and chronological notes
 hebrewbooks.org: Full Text

12th-century books
Hebrew-language chronicles
Hebrew-language religious books
Jewish philosophical and ethical texts
Jewish Spanish history